Aruba Practical Shooters Club (APSC) is the Aruban association for practical shooting under the International Practical Shooting Confederation.

References

External links 
 Official homepage of Aruba Practical Shooters Club

Regions of the International Practical Shooting Confederation
Sports organisations of Aruba
Sports organizations established in 1996